WSoD may refer to:

White Screen of Death
World Series of Darts